The Minotaur class was a three-ship class of armoured cruisers built in the first decade of the twentieth century for the Royal Navy. These were the last class of armoured cruisers built for the Royal Navy, with that role being substantially replaced by the first battlecruisers. These initially served with the Home Fleet, generally as the flagships of cruiser squadrons. Minotaur became flagship of the China Station in 1910 and Defence served as flagship of the 1st Cruiser Squadron in the Mediterranean from 1912; Shannon remained at home as flagship of several different squadrons.

Shannon remained with the Grand Fleet, as the Home Fleet was renamed, for the entire war. All three were present at the Battle of Jutland in May 1916, where Defence was sunk with the loss of all men on board. The surviving pair spent most of the rest of the war assigned to the Northern Patrol unsuccessfully searching for German warships and commerce raiders. The pair were scrapped after the war.

Design and description

The Minotaur-class ships were the last armoured cruisers built for the Royal Navy. They were significantly larger and more heavily armed than their predecessors, although their armour was reduced in an attempt to compensate for the additional weight of the armament. The design was criticized for this weakness as well as the wide dispersal of the  turrets along the length of the ship. They have been described by naval historian R. A. Burt as "cruiser editions of the ", and by E.H.H. Archibald of the Greenwich National Maritime Museum as "armed in a manner that presented one of the most ferocious sights in the fleet". A planned fourth ship of the class, Orion, was cancelled due to financial pressures arising from the purchase of the Swiftsure-class battleships.

Shannon had  more beam and one foot less draught than her sister ships to evaluate the theory that she might be faster with these proportions than her sisters. The Minotaurs were designed to carry 779 officers and enlisted men, but mustered 802–842 between 1908 and 1912.

During her sea trials on 6 December 1907, Minotaur made her designed speed when she reached 23.01 knots from  during her eight-hour full-power test. Shannon proved to be the slowest of the three and only reached  from  during her trial three days before Minotaurs.

Armament

The Minotaurs carried only four 50-calibre BL 9.2-inch Mk XI guns, compared to the six of the earlier ships, but the guns were mounted in twin hydraulically powered centreline turrets, which gave them the same four-gun broadside as the Duke of Edinburghs. The guns had an elevation range of −5°/+15°. The rate of fire of these guns was up to four rounds per minute and the ships carried 100 rounds per gun.

The secondary armament was much heavier than the older ships, with five single hydraulically powered turrets equipped with 50-calibre BL 7.5-inch Mk II guns mounted on each side. The guns could be depressed to −7.5° and elevated to +15°. Each gun was provided with 100 rounds.

Anti-torpedo boat defence was provided by sixteen QF 12-pounder 18-cwt guns. Eight of these were mounted on the tops of the 7.5 inch gun turrets and the other eight in the superstructure (four fore and four aft), as per the deck plan illustration. They also mounted five submerged 18-inch torpedo tubes, two on each broadside, plus one mounted in the stern.

Armour
Armour in the Minotaur class was reduced compared to the earlier ships. The upper belt, considered superfluous after the elimination of the main deck casemates, was eliminated as were the transverse bulkheads that connected the waterline belt to the barbettes that protected the ships from raking fire.

The main barbettes were protected by seven inches of armour as were the ammunition hoists, although the armour for those thinned to two inches between the lower and main decks. The thickness of the lower deck ranged from 1.5 inches on the flat amidships to two inches on the slope connecting it to the lower edge of the waterline belt for the length of the ship. At the ends of the ship, the thickness of the deck armour increased to two inches. The sides of the forward conning tower were 10 inches thick while those of the rear conning tower were three inches in thickness.

Modifications
The funnels were raised  in 1909 to eliminate smoke interference with the bridge. During 1915–16, a 12-pounder was fitted to the rear superstructure and a three-pounder to the quarterdeck, both guns on high-angle mounts for anti-aircraft defence. In 1916, reinforcing legs were added to the foremast to support the weight of a fire-control director; Shannon received her director that same year and Minotaur in 1917–18. In the last year of the war, the reinforced foremast was replaced by a stronger tripod mast and the 12-pounder was moved to the top of the forward turret.

Ships

Careers

The sisters were all initially assigned to the Home Fleet upon commissioning with Shannon frequently serving as the flagship of the 5th, 2nd and 3rd Cruiser Squadrons before reverting to the flagship of the 2nd Squadron in 1914. Minotaur became the flagship of the China Station in 1910 and she was briefly joined by Defence in 1912 before the latter was transferred to the Mediterranean at the end of the year to serve as flagship of the 1st Cruiser Squadron there.

When the war began, Minotaur searched unsuccessfully for the German East Asia Squadron in the Pacific and the commerce-raiding light cruiser  in the Indian Ocean before she was transferred to the Grand Fleet at the end of 1914. She became flagship of the 7th Cruiser Squadron and was assigned to the Northern Patrol. Defence participated in the pursuit of the German battlecruiser SMS Goeben and light cruiser SMS Breslau, but Rear-Admiral Ernest Troubridge decided not to engage Goeben due to the latter's more powerful guns, heavier armour and faster speed. She then blockaded the German ships inside the Dardanelles. The Admiralty ordered the ship to the South Atlantic in October to join Rear-Admiral Christopher Cradock's squadron searching for the German ships. Defence, however, had only reached Montevideo, Uruguay by 3 November when she received word that most of Admiral Cradock's squadron had been destroyed two days previously at the Battle of Coronel. The ship was then ordered to South Africa to escort a troop convoy to Great Britain. Defence departed Table Bay, Cape Town in December and rejoined the 1st Cruiser Squadron of the Grand Fleet as its flagship upon her arrival.

In early 1915, the sisters were all assigned to the Grand Fleet, each as flagship of their respective squadrons. Just before the Battle of Jutland on 31 May 1916, the 2nd and 7th Cruiser Squadrons were combined with Minotaur as the flagship. During the battle the 2nd Cruiser Squadron was unengaged and did not fire their guns. In contrast the 1st Cruiser Squadron was engaged at close range by the German capital ships during the battle; Defence was hit by two salvoes from the German ships that caused the aft 9.2-inch magazine to explode. The resulting fire spread via the ammunition passages to the adjacent 7.5-inch magazines which detonated in turn. The ship exploded with the loss of all men on board; between 893 and 903 men were killed.

Shannon and Minotaur were also present during the attempted interception of the High Seas Fleet by the Grand Fleet on 19 August although no combat occurred. For the rest of the war, the ships were assigned to the Northern Patrol. On 11 December 1917, the sisters and four destroyers were assigned to patrol the convoy route between Lerwick and Norway, but the Germans successfully destroyed a convoy off the Norwegian coast on the following day and returned home without being spotted. The British ships were only able to rescue survivors and escort the sole surviving ship from the convoy, the crippled destroyer , back to Scapa Flow.

The sisters were paid off in 1919, although Shannon temporarily became a training ship before the two were sold for scrap in 1920. Shannon was not actually broken up until January 1923.

Notes

Footnotes

Bibliography

External links

The Dreadnought Project Technical details of the ships.

Cruiser classes
 
Ship classes of the Royal Navy